Apt Pupil (1982) is a novella by Stephen King, originally published in the 1982 novella collection Different Seasons, subtitled "Summer of Corruption".

Format of the story
Apt Pupil consists of 30 chapters, many of which are headed by a month. Set in a fictional suburb of Southern California called "Santo Donato," the story unfolds over a period of about four years, with most of the action taking place during the first year and the last months. It is the only novella in Different Seasons to be narrated in the third person.

Plot summary
In 1974, Los Angeles teenager Todd Bowden arrives at the doorstep of elderly German immigrant Arthur Denker, accusing him of being a wanted Nazi war criminal named Kurt Dussander. The old man initially denies the allegation, but eventually acknowledges his true identity. Rather than turning Dussander over to the proper authorities, Todd asks to hear highly detailed stories about his crimes, having recently become interested in the Holocaust. However, Todd still threatens Dussander with exposure should he refuse his demands. Over the next several months, Todd visits Dussander daily under the pretext of reading to him, all the while badgering him into revealing more details of his atrocities. Todd soon gives Dussander a replica SS Oberleutnants uniform, forcing him to wear it and march on command.

As his relationship with Dussander continues, Todd also begins to have nightmares and sees his grades slip. After being confronted by his father about his grades, he forges his report cards before giving them to his parents. Eventually, Todd finds himself in danger of failing several courses. Ed French, Todd's guidance counselor, requests an appointment with the Bowdens. Todd and Dussander concoct a ruse, having Dussander go to French's appointment while posing as Todd's grandfather, Victor. Dussander falsely claims that Todd's grades are the result of problems at home, and promises to make sure his grades improve; French believes Dussander's story, but notices that Todd's "grandfather" does not mention him by name.

Knowing that Todd has been doctoring his report cards and knowingly socialized with a war criminal, Dussander blackmails him into spending his visits studying. With great effort, Todd is able to sufficiently improve his schoolwork. Since he no longer has any use for Dussander, Todd resolves to kill him and make it look like an accident. Todd had earlier claimed to have given a letter about Dussander to a friend; if anything should happen to Todd, the letter will be sent to the authorities. However, before Todd can kill Dussander, the old man realizes Todd's intentions and claims to have written about Todd's involvement with him, and put his statement into a safe deposit box that will be found upon his death. However, it is revealed that Dussander, like Todd, is also bluffing.

Over the next few months, Todd murders several homeless vagrants; he finds that committing murder somehow helps with his nightmares. As years pass, his visits to Dussander become less frequent. He loses his virginity, but finds sex unsatisfying compared to the thrill of committing murder. He rationalizes that his failure at sex is because his girlfriend is Jewish. When circumstances do not allow him to continue his serial killings, he picks a concealed spot overlooking the freeway and aims at people in passing cars with his hunting rifle. Dussander, suffering from his own nightmares, has also taken to killing the homeless for essentially the same reason as Todd, burying the bodies in his basement. Despite the link between them, Dussander and Todd are not immediately aware of each other's exploits.

One night when Dussander is digging a grave for his latest victim, he has a heart attack. He summons Todd, who buries the body and cleans up the crime scene before finally calling an ambulance. At the hospital, Dussander happens to share a room with Morris Heisel, an elderly Jewish man and Holocaust survivor who recognizes "Mr. Denker" but cannot place him. When Todd visits Dussander in the hospital, Dussander admits he was bluffing about his bank deposit box, as was Todd's threat about his letter. Dussander has read about the homeless men murdered by Todd and tells the boy not to get careless. Dussander declares that "we are quits".

A few days later, Heisel realizes that Denker is Dussander, the commandant of the camp (the fictional "Patin") where his wife and daughters were murdered in the gas chambers. An Israeli Nazi hunter named Weiskopf visits Dussander, telling him that he has been found out. After Weiskopf leaves, Dussander steals some drugs from the hospital dispensary and commits suicide. When Dussander's identity is revealed to the world, Todd convinces his parents that he did not know about Dussander's past. Meanwhile, a police detective named Richler, accompanied by Weiskopf, interviews Todd and is not so easily convinced. A vagrant recognizes Todd as the last person seen with several of the homeless victims and notifies the police.

Meanwhile, French meets Todd's real grandfather. French brings up their previous conversation, but the real Victor Bowden obviously does not recall their meeting and bears no physical resemblance to Dussander. French becomes suspicious and checks Todd's old report cards, finding that they have been tampered with. Later, he identifies Dussander as the man who met with him about Todd's grades. French confronts Todd, who responds by fatally shooting him. Todd's sanity finally breaks. He takes his rifle and ammunition to his hideout by the freeway and embarks on a shooting spree, resulting in his death at the hands of the authorities five hours later.

Connection to King's other works
 Kurt Dussander remembers using a "bank in the State of Maine" to purchase stocks under an assumed name. He goes on to say that the banker who bought them for Dussander went to jail for murdering his wife a year after he purchased them. He even references Andy Dufresne by name — he remembers the name because "it sounds a little like mine." Andy Dufresne is a central character in Rita Hayworth and Shawshank Redemption, the novella preceding Apt Pupil in Different Seasons.
 When confronting Todd about his murders, Dussander mentions a serial killer named "Springheel Jack". This killer is the focus of "Strawberry Spring", a short story published in the King collection Night Shift (1978).
 The guidance counselor Ed French mentions his hotel room is number 217, the same as the famous Overlook Hotel room in The Shining. Furthermore, in The Shining, Jack Torrance is working on a play that includes a character named Denker, the same name as Dussander's alter ego. This has led some fans to speculate that Apt Pupil is Torrance's play. In the afterword to Different Seasons, King mentions having written Apt Pupil immediately after The Shining.

Adaptations
 In 1987, an attempt at an adaptation by Alan Bridges was started but never finished. It starred Ricky Schroder as the lead Todd Bowden, and Nicol Williamson as Kurt Dussander. It was stated that about 40 minutes were shot. Other sources have stated that 75% of the movie was shot. It was never finished due to loss of money. Once the necessary finances were collected to finish the movie, Schroder was deemed too old for the role, so the project was abandoned. King stated he saw the unfinished rough cut with the footage shot and thought it was "very good".
 In 1995, Chicago's Defiant Theatre staged a full-scale adaptation of the novella at the Preston Bradley Center in Chicago, IL. The novella was adapted and directed for the stage by Christopher Johnson. Veteran stage and film actor William J. Norris starred as Kurt Dussander.
 Sony Pictures released a film version of Apt Pupil in 1998. The film was directed by Bryan Singer. Brad Renfro stars as Todd Bowden and Ian McKellen stars as Dussander. The ending of the film is significantly different.
 The song "A Skeleton in the Closet" by the thrash metal band Anthrax is based on the novella.
 Funk supergroup Cameo frequently adds the lyric "Don't pull a Bowden" when performing the anti-violence song "Word Up".
 The Family Guy episode "German Guy" is a parody of the novella.

See also
 Stephen King short fiction bibliography

Notes

References
 Stephen King, Summer of Corruption: Apt Pupil (published in Different Seasons), Viking Press, U.S.A., 1982.

1982 American novels
Fiction set in 1974
American novellas
American novels adapted into films
Novellas by Stephen King
Novels set in the 1970s
Thriller short stories
Novels set in Los Angeles
Novels about Nazi fugitives
Novels about neo-Nazism